The Wilberforce School is a private, classical Christian school in Princeton, New Jersey, serving students in kindergarten through twelfth grade.  Founded in 2005, the school is named in honor of abolitionist William Wilberforce. The Head of School is Howe Whitman and the Academic Dean is Karen Ristuccia.

The school has been accredited by the Middle States Association of Colleges and Schools Commission on Elementary and Secondary Schools since 2015; the school's accreditation expires in May 2022.

As of the 2017–18 school year, the school had an enrollment of 316 students and 52 classroom teachers (on an FTE basis), for a student–teacher ratio of 6:1. The school's student body was 68.6% (131) White, 18.8% (36) Asian, 7.3% (14) Black and 3.7% (7) Hispanic.

History

Founding
The school opened in the fall of 2005 following two years of discussion between David and Awilda Rowe and Howe and Brenda Whitman concerning educational options for their children.  Initially, the school met in the Lutheran Church of the Messiah on Nassau Street in Princeton Borough with classes for kindergarten through third grade.  The first head of school was Sara Capps, who had served for eleven years at the West Dallas Community School.

In 2006, Wilberforce gained a new principal, Karen Ristuccia, a graduate of Princeton University with a doctorate from Gordon-Conwell Theological Seminary.  Ristuccia had served for seventeen years as the head of the Westerly Learning Center, an educational ministry of Stone Hill Church of Princeton.  The growth of the school, with enrollment of 28, prompted a relocation to the Princeton Church of Christ in Princeton Township, with plans for an expansion up through sixth grade.

Expansion
Having expanded up through eighth grade and with an enrollment of 114, Wilberforce moved to its third home, the former Saint Joseph's Seminary, in 2011, as part of a consortium with the French-American School of Princeton and the American Boychoir School.  The new  campus allowed for proper athletic facilities, separate wings for the middle and lower schools.

To launch a high school for the 2014–15 academic year, the school moved to new space in the Windsor Athletic Club in West Windsor Township, which provided an additional  of classroom space, room for 100 more students, and access to the club's saltwater pool and full-size basketball court.  The club had initially been constructed as a Jewish community center but financial troubles caused that plan to fall through, allowing Wilberforce to move into newly finished school facilities.  The upper school was launched in partnership with Trinity Schools, with Wilberforce becoming the first Trinity Member School, licensing the Trinity curriculum and receiving ongoing training from Trinity teachers.

In 2019 the school returned to the former Saint Joseph's Seminary with the renovation and long-term lease of the campus' main building.

Academics

Student body
Wilberforce is located in the greater Princeton area.  The student body is drawn from a  radius, including students from Mercer, Middlesex, and Somerset counties in New Jersey as well as Bucks County, Pennsylvania.  The student body is 51% male and 49% female, with 6% Latino/Hispanic, 10% African American, 24% Asian American, 5% Middle Eastern American, 3% Pacific Islander American, and 51% European American students.  Families are drawn from a variety of Christian denominations including Protestant, Coptic, Messianic Jewish, Orthodox, and Roman Catholic.  Thirty percent of students receive financial aid.  Wilberforce students have consistently ranked in the 95th percentile in math and 92nd in verbal compared to national norms.  Admissions is competitive and students wear uniforms.

Educational philosophy
"The Wilberforce School was founded to provide a distinctly Christian education characterized by academic excellence and joyful discovery within a classical framework."

Classical framework
The school emphasizes Classical education, including the trivium, the teaching of the classics, and study of Latin.  Wilberforce applies the trivium by arguing that each academic discipline has three elements: a grammar (set of rules and vocabulary), a logic (organizing principles), and a rhetoric (discourses and applications). Each topic is taught using these three components: the factual knowledge, its interpretation, and its implications.  The trivium is also used by Wilberforce to describe the developmental stages of learning.  The lower school students, with their aptitude for memorization, focus on the grammar stage; the middle school, with the increased capability for abstract thought, emphasizes the logic stage; and the upper school, with greater eagerness to write and debate, enter the rhetoric stage.

Wilberforce emphasizes "classic" works of art, literature, and history.  The school defines a "classic" as "any work that every generation has read, studied, or cared about either because of its beauty and excellence or because of its influence and commentary on life."  These works are memorized and recited in the grammar years, analyzed in the logic years, and debated in the rhetoric years.

The study of the Latin language begins in Class Three (third grade) and is considered by the school to be an important tool for a number of reasons, including furthering the training of an ordered mind, providing the basis for half the words in the English language, aiding in the study of other European languages, and enabling the reading of many classic works in the original language.

Joyful discovery

Wilberforce draws on the educational philosophy of Charlotte Mason, who pioneered teaching methods that emphasized children's natural curiosity and delight in discovery.  Mason was a classical educator from mid-nineteenth century Britain at a time, similar to the present day, when classical education emphasized highly cognitive teaching, driven by memorization and drill.  She sought to avoid the tedium and exasperation that can mark overly rote educational environments by seeking to engage children's hearts and imaginations with the learning process.

Some practical applications of Mason's philosophy at Wilberforce include more limited hours in the early grades, including half-day kindergarten and a half-day option on Mondays, Wednesdays, and Fridays for Classes One and Two, freeing children to spend afternoons at home and at play.  In the early grades the major academic areas of reading and math are addressed in the morning when students are most alert, with the afternoons dedicated to art, music, and nature studies.

Wilberforce follows Mason's emphasis on the importance of developing good habits, including kindness, diligence, attentiveness, respect, order, and follow-through.

Joyful discovery is emphasized by seeking to bring history and ideas alive through works of biography, fiction, drama, art, exploration, and play that are of proven excellence and age-appropriateness.  Mason further highlighted the importance of contemplative study and exploration of nature, a practice integrated into the Wilberforce curriculum.

Distinctively Christian

The teaching and conduct of Wilberforce is undergirded by its understanding of God as Creator and of His saving purposes in Jesus Christ.  The school seeks to nurture students with a genuine love of learning who live as vibrant Christians, able to articulate and defend the Christian message with conviction, clarity, and creativity.  Wilberforce teaches that all truth and beauty was created by, reflects, is sustained by, and exists for Jesus Christ.  The school's curriculum is held together by an orthodox, biblical view of the world and seeks to apply biblical lessons to all aspects of life.  Wilberforce teaches students that everything should be done as an act of worship to God.

Students attend a weekly chapel on Friday mornings to which their family members are invited.  The curriculum includes the reading, memorization, and study of scripture as well as classic hymns, poems, and writings of the Christian faith.

Athletics
Wilberforce has access to the athletic facilities of the Windsor Athletic Club, with which it shares a building, including a saltwater pool.  It competes with other area private and charter schools including Stuart Country Day School, Princeton Charter School, The Pennington School, and The Lawrenceville School.  The coaching staff includes Olympic hopeful Rebeka Stowe, and among the student athletes was Acasio Pinheiro, the USA Track and Field New Jersey 2015 Junior Olympic Athlete of the Year.

Interscholastic sports offered include:

* Fall sports: Boys and Girls Soccer, Cross-Country,  and Bowling

* Winter sports: Boys and Girls Basketball, Coed Swimming

* Spring sports: Boys and Girls Lacrosse, Coed Track

The girls' cross country team won the New Jersey State Interscholastic Athletic Association Non-Public Group B state title at the state group meet, the first state championship in the history of the program.

References

External links
Official Website
Wilberforce videos

Christian schools in New Jersey
West Windsor, New Jersey
2005 establishments in New Jersey
Educational institutions established in 2005
Private high schools in Mercer County, New Jersey
Private middle schools in New Jersey
Private elementary schools in New Jersey
Classical Christian schools
Nondenominational Christian schools in the United States